Serve the People! is a 2005 novel by Yan Lianke. The English version, translated by Julia Lovell, was published in 2010 by Black Cat/Grove.

Plot
Set during the Cultural Revolution, at the peak of the cult of personality of Chairman Mao, the novel tells the story of an affair between the Liu Lian, the wife of a powerful military commander, and a young peasant soldier, Wu Dawang. Liu Lian tells Wu Dawang that whenever she removes the household's wooden 'Serve the People!' sign from its usual place on the dinner table, he must attend to her needs in the bedroom. Liu Lian discovers that destroying her absent husband's sacred Mao icons - such as the Little Red Book and statues of the Chairman - turns her on.

The title is a reference to a phrase originally coined by Mao in a 1944 article of the same name that commemorated the death of the red army soldier Zhang Side. During the Cultural Revolution, this article was required reading for millions of Chinese, and the slogan was widely used.

Reception

Due to the sex scenes and sensitive political content, the story attracted controversy in China when it was featured the literary magazine Huacheng in 2005. The Chinese government ordered the publisher to recall all 40,000 copies of the magazine, which in turn created huge demand for the novel. The novel was banned by the Chinese government. It has been translated into French, Danish, Norwegian, German, Dutch, Italian, Czech and English.

Adaptation
There were reports in 2013 of a South Korean erotic film adaptation by Jang Cheol-soo (set in North Korea). The film began filming in 2020. The film titled Serve the People is set to be released on February 23, 2022 in South Korea.

References

2005 Chinese novels
Novels by Yan Lianke
Novels about the Cultural Revolution
Adultery in novels
Chinese historical novels
Chinese erotic novels
Chinese novels adapted into films